Su Gang (1920–2002) was a People's Republic of China politician. He was born in Laoling County, Shandong Province (modern Laoling). He was governor of Guizhou Province.

1920 births
2002 deaths
People's Republic of China politicians from Shandong
Chinese Communist Party politicians from Shandong
Governors of Guizhou